The Roman Catholic Diocese of Évry–Corbeil-Essonnes (Latin: Dioecesis Evriensis–Corbiliensis-Exonensis; French: Diocèse d'Evry–Corbeil-Essonnes) is a diocese of the Latin Church of the Roman Catholic Church in France. Erected in 1966 as the Diocese of Corbeil, the diocese was split off from the Diocese of Versailles. In 1988, the diocese was renamed to the Diocese of Évry–Corbeil-Essonnes. Currently the diocese remains a suffragan of the Archdiocese of Paris.

The current bishop is Michel Armand Alexis Jean Pansard who was appointed on 1 August 2017 by Pope Francis.

Ordinaries 
Albert-Georges-Yves Malbois (9 Oct 1966 Appointed – 13 Sep 1977 Resigned) (died 2 February 2017)
Guy Alexis Herbulot (12 May 1978 Appointed – 15 Apr 2000 Retired)
Michel Dubost, C.I.M. (15 Apr 2000 Appointed – 1 August 2017 Retired)
Michel Armand Alexis Jean Pansard (1 August 2017 Appointed – present)

See also 
Catholic Church in France
List of Catholic dioceses in France

References

External links 
  Centre national des Archives de l'Église de France, L’Épiscopat francais depuis 1919, retrieved: 2016-12-24. 
 http://www.catholic-hierarchy.org/diocese/devry.html 

Évry-Corbeil-Essonnes
1966 establishments in France